Kiril Makedonski (19 January 1925 – 2 June 1984) was a Macedonian composer. Born as Kiril Vangelov in Bitola, Kingdom of Yugoslavia, Makedonski studied music composition at the Zagreb Conservatory in Croatia. He is best known today for composing Goce (1954), the first opera in Macedonian, which was commissioned for the inaugural performance of the Macedonian National Opera Company. He wrote two other operas, King Samoil and Ilinden. His other compositions include five symphonies, two ballets, two symphonic poems, and a large amount of choral music and vocal art songs.

References

Macedonian composers
Male composers
1925 births
1984 deaths
Macedonian opera composers
Music in Socialist Republic of Macedonia
People from Bitola
20th-century classical composers
Male classical composers
Yugoslav composers
20th-century male musicians